Cynthia B. Whitchurch  is an Australian microbiologist. Whitchurch is a research group leader at the Quadram Institute on the Norwich Research Park in the United Kingdom and was previously the founding director of the Microbial Imaging Facility and a Research Group Leader in the Institute of Infection, Immunity and Innovation (The ithree institute) at the University of Technology Sydney (UTS) in New South Wales.

Whitchurch studies bacteria and the ways in which their behavior coordinates to form biofilms, an area with importance for the treatment of infection and the use of antibiotics.
Whitchurch became a fellow of the Australian Academy of Science in 2019, in recognition of her discovery that DNA plays a novel role in nature that is unrelated to its roles in genetic functioning. 
Whitchurch determined that extracellular DNA (eDNA) is essential to and promotes the self-organization of biofilms. This information is credited with creating a paradigm shift in the understanding of biofilm biology.

Education 
Whitchurch attended the University of Queensland, where she completed a B. Sc. with Honors in 1989 and her PhD in 1994. She then continued with postdoctoral training at the University of Queensland from 1995 to 2001. In 2001 Whitchurch undertook further training at the University of California, San Francisco, returning to Australia in 2004.

Career
In 2004, Whitchurch established her own research group in the Department of Microbiology at Monash University. University of Technology Sydney recruited Whitchurch in 2008; there she leads a research team that is part of the Institute of Infection, Immunity and Innovation (The ithree institute). The team is investigating bacterial lifestyles looking at their connections to infection and antibiotic resistance. Whitchurch established and is the Director of the Microbial Imaging Facility at UTS. In 2019, Whitchurch moved from Australia to join the Quadram Institute in the United Kingdom. Whitchurch's group at the Quadram Institute researches how bacterial communities build biofilms and produce shared resources such as extracellular DNA, moonlighting proteins and membrane vesicles.

Research
Whitchurch contributed to the discovery of novel roles for DNA unrelated to its genetic function, including the discovery in 2002 that extracellular DNA (eDNA) is required for building multicellular bacterial communities known as biofilms. Whitchurch's discovery that extracellular DNA (eDNA) is essential to and promotes the self-organization of biofilms is credited with creating a paradigm shift in the understanding of biofilm biology.

One of the bacteria that Whitchurch studies is Pseudomonas aeruginosa, a common bacterium which has developed a dangerous antibiotic-resistant strain or superbug. P. aeruginosa thrives on implanted devices such as catheters, and is a significant cause of hospital-acquired infections. 
P. aeruginosa also forms potentially life-threatening biofilms in the lungs of cystic fibrosis patients.

In addition to using sophisticated microscopes, Whitchurch and her team have developed computer programs to analyze data to segment, identify, track and analyse the movements of bacterial cells. They have used the UTS "data arena" to create interactive 360-degree 3-dimensional computational displays representing the behavior of bacterial cells. Color-coding cells according to the speed at which they move, and studying the ways in which bacteria move across surfaces, helps Whitchurch to visualize behaviors in new ways. Recognizing that P. aeruginosa tends to create and follow pathways (a process known as stigmergy) has led her to experiment with the use of furrowed surfaces in catheters. This appears to disrupt the movement of the bacteria and may help to prevent infection.

In 2016, Whitchurch, Lynne Turnbull and other researchers from Australia, Japan and Switzerland discovered that the bacterium P. aeruginosa can actively explode, widely distributing its contents when it dies. Its protein, DNA, and virulence factors then become available to other bacterium and support the formation of increasingly dangerous biofilms. A particular gene appears to support both this explosive cell lysis and the formation of biofilms. This suggests possibilities for treatment.

Awards and recognition 
Whitchurch received the R Douglas Wright Career Development Award (2004-2008) from the National Health and Medical Research Council. In 2009 she was awarded an NHMRC Senior Research Fellowship.

In 2017 Whitchurch was awarded the David Syme Research Prize, an award recognizing "the best original research in biology, physics, chemistry or geology, produced in Australia during the preceding two years". She was the first woman in more than 30 years to receive the prize.

In 2019 Whitchurch was elected to the Australian Academy of Science.

Media 
Whitchurch's research on biofilms was featured by the Australian Broadcasting Corporation in 2002 and 2013 and The Australian in 2019.

References

External links
 Monash University -- Department of Microbiology
University of Technology Sydney Microbial Imaging Facility
University of Technology Sydney Institute of Infection, Immunity and Innovation
Quadram Institute

University of Queensland alumni
Australian microbiologists
Year of birth missing (living people)
Fellows of the Australian Academy of Science
Living people
Academic staff of Monash University
Academic staff of the University of Technology Sydney